Social Text is an academic journal published by Duke University Press. Since its inception by an independent editorial collective in 1979, Social Text has addressed a wide range of social and cultural phenomena, covering questions of gender, sexuality, race, and the environment. Each issue covers subjects in the debates around feminism, Marxism, neoliberalism, postcolonialism, postmodernism, queer theory, and popular culture. The journal has since been run by different collectives over the years, mostly based at New York City universities. It has maintained an avowedly progressive political orientation and scholarship over these years, if also a less Marxist one. Since 1992, it is published by Duke University Press.

The journal gained notoriety in 1996 for the Sokal affair, when it published a nonsensical article that physicist Alan Sokal had deliberately written as a hoax. The editors of the journal were awarded the 1996 Ig Nobel Prize for literature by "eagerly publishing research that they could not understand, that the author said was meaningless, and which claimed that reality does not exist". The journal did not practice academic peer review, and it did not submit the article for outside expert review by a physicist.

See also
 Science wars

References

External links
 

Cultural journals
Critical theory
Duke University Press academic journals
Publications established in 1979
Quarterly journals
English-language journals